Quazi Deen Mohammad is a Bangladeshi physician, academic and neurologist. He is the founding director of National Institute of Neuroscience, Dhaka. He was the 37th principal of Dhaka Medical College and 19th President of Bangladesh College of Physicians and Surgeons (BCPS).

Early life and education 
Quazi Deen Mohammad was born in Luxmipur, Faridpur of Bangladesh, the then East Pakistan. He passed SSC from Faridpur Zilla School and HSC from Government Rajendra College. He passed MBBS from Dhaka Medical College in 1978. He completed fellowship in Medicine from Bangladesh College of Physicians and Surgeons in 1983. He did fellowship in clinical neurophysiology from University Hospital Madison, U.S. in 1989. He achieved M.D. in Neurology from University of Dhaka in 1994.

Career 
Quazi Deen Mohammad joined as Assistant professor of Neurology at the then IPGMR, now known as Bangabandhu Sheikh Mujib medical University in 1984. He joined Dhaka Medical College as Professor of Neurology in 1996. Later, He worked as the Principal of Dhaka Medical College from 2004 to 2012. Afterwards, he became founding director of National Institute of Neuroscience. He regularly provides treatment to his patients at S.P.R.C & Neurology Hospital.

Research activities 

 Chairman, Neurology research center, NINS 
 Advisor, Neurology Asia, Malaysia
 PI, Annexon 005 clinical trial (C1q suppressor in GBS) in Bangladesh
 PI, community survey Stroke, Epilepsy, Dementia
 Senior contributor in the collaborative study between NINS and Citran (University of Sheffield, UK) on Neurodegenerative disease particularly motor Neuron disease and Parkinson's disease.
 Senior contributor in different collaborative study between NINS and Erasmus MC (Netherlands), CDC Atlanta (U.S.) Annexon (U.S.) and ICDDR,B

International reviewer 

 Journal of Neuroscience and Neurological Disorders- Netherlands
 Hindawi Publication, UK
 Horizon Research Publishing, US
 Neurology Asia

Publications
He co-authored Epilepsy- Beliefs & misbelieves – WHO Bulletin. He published 186 research articles in national and internationally reputed journals.

Awards and honors 

 Honorary fellowship, College of Physicians and Surgeons Pakistan 
 Professor Ibrahim Memorial Gold Medal

References

Year of birth missing (living people)
Living people
Bangladeshi neurologists
Academic staff of Dhaka Medical College and Hospital